Brighton Aldridge Community Academy (BACA) is a coeducational academy school in Brighton. It opened on 1 September 2010.

The school replaced Falmer High School and is part of the Aldridge Education multi-academy trust. Dylan Davies became Brighton Aldridge Community Academy's second Principal succeeding Phil Hogg on her retirement, taking up the role in January 2014.

In October 2010 the school announced a partnership with Sussex Cricket League to promote cricket in the area. The Aldridge Cricket Academy was subsequently formed which allows sixth form students from Brighton Aldridge Community Academy or Portslade Aldridge Community Academy to combine A level studies with an intensive cricket development programme.

Brighton Aldridge Community Academy, Portslade Aldridge Community Academy and Latest TV jointly provide a digital media academy to students called the Brighton Digital Media Academy (BDMA), which launched in September 2015.

The school was rated "Good" in all categories by Ofsted in January 2017. An Ofsted inspection in March 2022 rated the school "Inadequate", the lowest rating.

Campus
The building was designed by architects Feilden Clegg Bradley and constructed by building firm Kier Group. The first phase of the new building was finished in September 2010 and all buildings were completed by September 2011.

References

External links
 Brighton Aldridge Community Academy official website
 Proposed Falmer Academy

Academies in Brighton and Hove
Educational institutions established in 2010
2010 establishments in England
Secondary schools in Brighton and Hove